Wadala Sandhuan (Punjabi,) (Sandhuan also spelled Sandhwan or Sundhwan) is a town situated on the Gujranwala-Pasrur road in the Punjab province of Pakistan. Wadala Sandhuan is located at 32.11° North, 74.24° East. it is 232 meters (761 ft) above sea level and is nearly 18 km away from Gujranwala. This town belongs to Tehsil Daska and District Sialkot. The town is on the Gujranwala-Pasrur  road, which allows logistical connections to the cities such as Pasrur and Gujranwala. It is in between Gujranwala and Pasrur. The town is home to grain markets which provides jobs for thousands of people. There are over 30 rice mills located in the area from which Shahid Butt Brothers Rice mill is one of the  major market contributor. A Wheat Flour Mill owned the same Butt Family (Hudaibiya Flour & General Mills) is making it one of the major wheat grain contributor to markets in the Punjab region. There are vast green fields and gardens around the town. It shares the borders with some small towns and villages such as Kotli Kheran, Gopipur, Rampur, Chakri, Jhang, Dherowali, Ramke etc. Punjabi and Mewati are the local language, but Urdu is also common, particularly in schools and offices. Lahore Sialkot Motorway M11 is passing through. It shall intersect 18 km Gujranwal Pasrur Road and an interchange will be near Hudaibeya Flour Mills which will link to Pasrur, Satrah, Mianwali Bangla, Siranwali, Wadala Sandhuan, Dahrmkot Chock, Talwandi Musa Khan Gujranwala and surroundings. This Mega project will enhance and improve the Business, Educational, and Social activities in Wadala Sandhuan and Surroundings.

Transportation

Gujranwala-Pasrur road passes through the town and links it to many of the villages and town. By road, the town is less than one hours away from Gujranwala and Daska one hour drive from Sialkot. It is situated on the Gujranwala-Pasrur road which passes through the centre of the town. The nearest railway station is about 19 km away (Gujranwala railway station) this Railway Station was built by the British before the Independence of Pakistan and was one of the largest railway stations of the Asia. Sialkot International Airport is approximately 35 km away from Wadala Sandhuan. Lahore Sialkot Motorway M11 is passing through. It shall intersect 18 km Gujranwal Pasrur Road and an interchange will be near Hudaibeya Flour Mills which will link to Pasrur, Satrah, Mianwali Bangla, Siranwali, Wadala Sandhuan, Dahrmkot Chock, Talwandi Musa Khan Gujranwala and surroundings. This Mega project will not only reduce the distances in between cities but enhance and improve the Business, Educational, and Social activities in Wadala Sandhuan and Surroundings. Lahore Shall be just a half hour and Sialkot 15 mints from Wadala Sandhuan.

Distance to biggest cities

Nearby villages

Climate

Wadala Sandhuan is located at 32.11° North, 74.24° East. it is 232 meters (761 ft) above sea level. It shares the borders with some small towns and villages such as Kotli Kheran, Gopipur, Rampur, Chakri, Jhang, Dherowali, Ramke etc.
The climate of Wadala Sandhuan changes quite drastically through the year. It is cold during winters and hot and humid during summers. May and June are the hottest months. It's quite humid during rainy season of July and August. The summer periods last from June through to September where the temperature reaches 36-42 degrees Celsius. The coldest months are usually November to February. The temperature can drop to seven degrees Celsius on average. The highest precipitation months are usually July and August when the Monsoon season hits the Punjab province. Most of the rain falls during the Monsoon season in summer which sometimes results in flooding. During the other months the average rainfall is roughly 25 mm. The driest months are usually November through to April, when little rainfall is seen.

References

External links

 Google Maps: Wadala Sandhuan
 Panoramio.com

Market towns in Pakistan
Cities and towns in Sialkot District